Carrollwood is an unincorporated community in Hillsborough County, Florida,  United States. It is part of the larger census-designated place (CDP) of Carrollwood, which also includes the neighborhood of Carrollwood Village. A census-designated place corresponding just to Carrollwood existed during the 1990 census, with a population of 7,195. The ZIP code for Carrollwood is 33618.

History 
Carrollwood was founded in 1959 and was built out in the 1960s. The community spread westward during the 1970s and 1980s. The community was planned by Matt Jetton and originally developed by his land development company, Sun State Homes. From 1959 through 1970, more than 900 homes were built on land in the vicinity of Lake Carroll. Carrollwood Elementary school was constructed in 1963. Carrollwood was struck by a tornado outbreak, which occurred throughout Central Florida on April 4, 1966. As the neighboring development of Carrollwood Village was established in the early 1970s, the Carrollwood Country Club  was built in 1972 and remains a popular landmark in the community today.

Geography
Carrollwood is located at 28.1 degrees north, 82.5 degrees west (28.0523, -82.4858).

Carrollwood boundaries include Lake Magdalene to the north, Tampa to the east, Egypt Lake to the south, and Carrollwood Village to the west.

Transportation
Some of the major roads serving the community are Dale Mabry Highway, Busch Boulevard, Bearss Avenue  and Fletcher Avenue.

Education
Lake Magdalene Elementary School
Essrig Elementary School
Hill Middle School
Adams Middle School
Chamberlain High School
Carrollwood Elementary School
Canela Elementary School
Gaither High School

See also
Carrollwood Village
Carrollwood (CDP), a census defined area which consists of the communities of Carrollwood & Carrollwood Village

References

External links 
Carrollwood Official Community Website
Carrollwood profile from Hometown Locator

Unincorporated communities in Hillsborough County, Florida
Former census-designated places in Hillsborough County, Florida
Unincorporated communities in Florida
Former census-designated places in Florida